The Mato Grosso gubernatorial election was held on 5 October 2014 to elect the next governor of the state of Mato Grosso. If no candidate had received more than 50% of the vote, a second-round runoff election would have been held on 26 October.  Governor Silval Barbosa did not run for a second term.  Senator Pedro Taques of the PDT won election to the open seat in the first round.

Candidates
Pedro Taques 12 (PDT) - Senator from Mato Grosso (elected in 2010)
Carlos Fávaro 12 (PP) - agricultural producer; former President of the Association of Corn and Soybean Producers (Aprosoja)
Lúdio Cabral 13 (PT) - former Cuiabá Councillor (elected in 2004, 2008); candidate for Mayor of Cuiabá (2012)
Teté Bezerra 13 (PMDB) - State Deputy (elected in 2010)
Dr. José Roberto 50 (PSOL) - lawyer
Marco Natale 50 (PSOL) - accountant
Janete Riva 55 (PSD)
Dr. Aray 55 (PSD)

Coalitions

Opinion Polling

Results

References

2014 Brazilian gubernatorial elections
October 2014 events in South America
2014